The 2021 Syracuse Orange women's soccer team represented Syracuse University during the 2021 NCAA Division I women's soccer season.  The Orange were led by head coach Nicky Adams, in her third season.  They played home games at SU Soccer Stadium.  This is the team's 25th season playing organized women's college soccer, and their 8th playing in the Atlantic Coast Conference.

The Orange finished the season 4–12–1, 0–10–0 in ACC play to finish in fourteenth place. They did not qualify for the ACC Tournament.  They were not invited to the NCAA Tournament.

Previous season 

Due to the COVID-19 pandemic, the ACC played a reduced schedule in 2020 and the NCAA Tournament was postponed to 2021.  The ACC did not play a spring league schedule, but did allow teams to play non-conference games that would count toward their 2020 record in the lead up to the NCAA Tournament.

The Orange finished the fall season 1–7–0, 1–7–0 in ACC play to finish in a tie for eleventh place. They did not qualify for the ACC Tournament.  The Orange did not participate in the spring season and were not invited to the NCAA Tournament.

Squad

Roster

Team management

Source:

Schedule

Source:

|-
!colspan=6 style=""| Exhibition

|-
!colspan=6 style=""| Non-Conference Regular season

|-
!colspan=6 style=""| ACC Regular season

Rankings

References

Syracuse
Syracuse
2021
Syracuse women's soccer